Sharples Separator Works, also known as the Gumas Warehouse and Kauffman Warehouse, is a historic factory complex located in West Chester, Chester County, Pennsylvania. Built between 1890 and 1909 by Philip M. Sharples, the site includes fourteen contributing buildings. They range between one and three stories, are of brick construction, and have low pitched gable roofs or hipped roofs. It was home to the manufacturing works for the Sharples Tubular Centrifugal Separator, the first American invented cream separator.

It was listed on the National Register of Historic Places in 1984.

References

West Chester, Pennsylvania
Industrial buildings and structures on the National Register of Historic Places in Pennsylvania
Industrial buildings completed in 1909
Buildings and structures in Chester County, Pennsylvania
National Register of Historic Places in Chester County, Pennsylvania
1909 establishments in Pennsylvania